Wiesendanger Falls, also known as Double Falls and Twanklaskie Falls, is a 50-foot waterfall on the Columbia River Gorge, Multnomah County, Oregon, United States. Its main drop is 50 feet and is located upstream of Multnomah Falls and accessed through the Multnomah-Wahkeena Loop Hike.

History 
The name of the waterfall is from Albert Wiesendanger, a notable USDA Forest Service worker in the first half of the 20th century. The name is spelled "Wiesendanger" on a commemorating plaque on the trail to the waterfall, with the "i" before the "e". Other sources spell the vowels in reverse, the "e" before the "i".

See also 
 List of waterfalls in Oregon

Sources

Waterfalls of Oregon
Waterfalls of Multnomah County, Oregon